Dani Kouch (born 11 October 1990) is a footballer who plays for Cambodian club Preah Khan Reach Svay Rieng, as a midfielder. Born in France, he represents Cambodia at international level.

Career 
Born in Nantes, France, Kouch has played club football for TriAsia Phnom Penh, Phnom Penh Crown and Nagaworld.

He made his international debut for Cambodia in 2018.

Honours

Club 
Nagaworld
Cambodian League: 2018

References 

1990 births
Living people
Footballers from Nantes
French people of Cambodian descent
French footballers
Cambodian footballers
Cambodia international footballers
Angkor Tiger FC players
Phnom Penh Crown FC players
Nagaworld FC players
Association football midfielders